ECTFE (ethylenechlorotrifluoroethylene) is a copolymer of ethylene and chlorotrifluoroethylene. It is a semi-crystalline fluoropolymer (a partially fluorinated polymer) designed to provide chemical resistance in heavy-duty corrosion applications.

Physical and chemical properties

ECTFE is resistant to acids at high concentrations and temperatures, caustic media, oxidizing agents and many solvents. It has similar chemical resistance to PTFE. A chemical resistance table, based on immersion tests, has explored this further. Permeation of large molecules is slow in fluoropolymers and thus is not relevant in the final application. Small molecules, however, may permeate through the polymer matrix at a relevant time. In lining or coating applications, the permeation of certain small molecules determines the lifetime of anti-corrosion protection. H2O, O2, Cl2, H2S, HCl, HF, HBr, N2, H2, CH3OH, etc. are relatively mobile in a polymer matrix and lead to measurable effects. Permeation resistance is significant for lining and coating applications, because permeating species may attack underlying mechanical layers, such as fiber reinforced plastic or steel. This high permeation resistance to small molecules is a consequence of the free volume occupied by the chlorine atom in the polymer chain.

ECTFE has a continuous usage temperature range between typically –76 °C and +150 °C (–105F to +300F). It has good impact resistance and Young's modulus in the range of 1700 MPa, allowing for self-standing items and pressure piping systems. ECTFE maintains high impact strength in cryogenic applications.

In terms of fire resistance, ECTFE shows a limiting oxygen index of 52%. This is between the fully fluorinated polymers PTFE, PFA and FEP with a limiting oxygen index of 95% and other partially fluorinated polymers like PVDF with a limiting oxygen index of 44% and ETFE with a limiting oxygen index of 30%.

ECTFE is an electrical insulator, with high resistivity and a low dielectric constant as well as a low dissipation factor, allowing its use for wire and cable primary and secondary jacketing.
Similar to other fluoropolymers, ECTFE has good UV resistance, in particular against UV-A and UV-B. ECTFE films can be transparent.

ECTFE is welded in a variety of methods, including:
 Butt welding
 Infrared welding
 High frequency welding
 Hot gas welding
 Ultrasonic welding

Applications
ECTFE is applied in several ways:
 By electrostatic powder coating on metal surfaces
 By rotolining on metal surfaces rotolining grade Halar 6012F
 By sheet lining on metal surface or on fiber reinforced plastic FRP (glass fiber, carbon fiber, ...).
 By extrusion or injection molding of self standing items, in particular pressure pipes
 By rotomolding of self standing items like tanks or other shapes (rotomolding grade)
 As a protective film using an adequate adhesive

ECTFE powder is most commonly used in electrostatic powder coating. ECTFE powder coatings have a typical thickness of 0,8 mm but can be applied up to 2 mm with a special grade for high build up.

Extrusion of ECTFE fabric-backed sheets and subsequent fabrication to vessels, pipes or valves is used in the chemical industry. Thick sheets are compression molded and can go up to 50 mm in thickness. They are used in the semiconductor industry for wet benches or machining other parts.

The most common application of ECTFE is in the field of corrosion protection. ECTFE is used for corrosion protection in industries including:
 Bleaching towers in pulp and paper
 Sulfuric acid production and storage
 Flue gas treatment in particular in the SNOX and WSA process
 Electrolysis collectors or drying towers in the chlorine industry
 Transport vessels for hazardous goods, in particular class 8
 Halogen related industry (bromine, chlorine, fluorine)
 Acid handling (sulfuric acid, nitric acid, phosphoric acid, hydrogen halides, hydrogen sulfide, etc.)
 Mining applications, in particular high pressure heap leach

ECTFE has been widely used in the semiconductor industry, for wet tool and tubing systems for lithographic chemicals.

ECTFE is also used in the pharmaceutical industry.

Moreover, ECTFE is used for primary and secondary jacketing in specialty cables like data cables or self-regulating heating cables, applications where good fire resistance and electrical properties are key properties. ECTFE is also used for braiding in that field.

ECTFE in the form of a monofilament fiber is used in flue gas treatment and in certain chemical processes.

Unlike PTFE, ECTFE can be crimped which allows its production in the form of nonwoven fibers with high surface area and porosity. Even though such material has low chemical reactivity, ECTFE in general has somewhat lower chemical resistance comparing to PTFE.

Halar films are used in the aircraft industry as well as for photovoltaic front and back sheets.

ECTFE is used for manufacturing gaskets to store liquid oxygen and other propellants for aerospace applications.

See also
 bs4994 ECTFE as a thermoplastic lining for dual laminate chemical process plant equipment's
 RTP-1 ECTFE as a thermoplastic lining for dual laminate ASME stamped vessels.

References

Plastics
Fluoropolymers
Copolymers
Thermoplastics